The ABACABA pattern is a recursive fractal pattern that shows up in many places in the real world (such as in geometry, art, music, poetry, number systems, literature and higher dimensions). Patterns often show a DABACABA type subset. AA, ABBA, and ABAABA type forms are also considered.

Generating the pattern 
In order to generate the next sequence, first take the previous pattern, add the next letter from the alphabet, and then repeat the previous pattern. The first few steps are listed here. A  generator can be found here

ABACABA is a "quickly growing word", often described as chiastic or "symmetrically organized around a central axis" (see: Chiastic structure and Χ).

Gallery

See also 
 Arch form
 Farey sequence
 Rondo
 Sesquipower

Notes

References

External links 
Naylor, Mike: abacaba.org

Fractals